Mærwynn, also known as St. Merewenna or Merwinna, ( AD) was a 10th-century  abbess of Romsey Abbey. She is recognised as a saint in the Catholic and Eastern Orthodox Churches.

Life

Mærwynn was the founding abbess of the reconsecrated Abbey of Romsey, and there is some certainty that she was appointed to the position by King Edgar the Peaceable on Christmas day in 974. While medieval legend had it that she was born in Ireland and educated by St. Patrick, historical understanding that five centuries separate them discounts this. 

King Edgar sent Ælfflæd, his daughter, to Mærwynn for care, and she became like a foster mother to the princess.

Veneration 
Mærwynn was buried at Romsey Abbey, close by to where her protégé Ælfflæd was buried. Her primary feast day is 10 February in both the Catholic and Eastern Orthodox churches. There are secondary commemorations in the Catholic Church marking the date of the translation of her relics (and of Ælfflæd's) on 29 October, with certain other secondary days of note mentioned by the Monks of Ramsgate.

Romsey Abbey
The foundations of Mærwynn's abbey have been located under the tower, choir stalls and part of the nave of the current Norman church. Mærwynn's abbey was the second of the four church buildings to be built on the site; it was destroyed by Vikingss in 1003 AD.

References

External links
 

Medieval English saints
Year of birth unknown
Anglo-Saxon nuns
Anglo-Saxon abbesses
Female saints of medieval England
10th-century Christian saints
East Anglian saints
10th-century English nuns
Burials at Romsey Abbey